Wilfrid Wolters McVittie (24 May 190617 September 1980) was  Ambassador Extraordinary And Plenipotentiary of Great Britain to the Dominican Republic from 1958 to 1962. A career consul, he also served in Argentina, Portugal, and the United States.

Personal life
McVittie was born in Smyrna (now Izmir), Ottoman Empire to an English father who had arrived for the tobacco trade. Wilfrid married the former Morna Harriett Mary Mornington. Together they became the parents of two daughters and a son.

References

Ambassadors of the United Kingdom to the Dominican Republic
1906 births
1980 deaths
British expatriates in Argentina
British expatriates in Portugal
British expatriates in the United States
British expatriates in the Ottoman Empire